Mirko Gruden (June 22, 1911 Monfalcone - September 12, 1967 Grado) was an Italian professional football player.

1911 births
1967 deaths
People from Monfalcone
Italian footballers
Serie A players
A.C. Legnano players
Inter Milan players
Palermo F.C. players
Genoa C.F.C. players
Venezia F.C. players
Catania S.S.D. players
Association football midfielders
A.S. Pro Gorizia players
Footballers from Friuli Venezia Giulia